Leyenburg is a RandstadRail station in The Hague, Netherlands. It is a stop for RandstadRail line 4, tram line 6, and bus lines 21, 23, 26, 27, 31, 34, 35, 36, 37 and 86, and is located on the Leyweg. Leyenburg serves as an important interchange between bus and tram services.

RandstadRail services
The following services currently call at Leyenburg:

Tram Services

Bus service

Gallery

RandstadRail stations in The Hague